Predicted line of sight (PLOS) is a method of missile targeting. In PLOS, the operator tracks the target with the missile launcher's onboard sights for a short period of time (3-5 seconds). Software on the launcher extrapolates from the data gathered, producing a prediction of the route required to intercept the moving target. When fired the missile uses inertial navigation to fly this course and hopefully engage the target either by direct contact or via proximity fuse detonating the warhead. The method is used by the NLAW anti-tank weapon.

For a moving vehicle, the course will be a curve, the greater the angular velocity of the target from the launcher the smaller the radius of the curve. The curve is such that if the launcher had kept tracking the target after launch the missile would always be on the line between the launcher and target. This is what is attempted by command to line of sight (CLOS) but in the case of PLOS, no commands are issued post-launch and the target is not tracked by either the missile or the launcher. It is a fire-and-forget technique.

See also
 Command guidance
 Manual command to line of sight (MCLOS)
 Fire-and-forget

References 

 
Missile guidance